Nguyễn Thị Minh Khai High school (also known as Gia Long all-girls school, Áo Tím all-girls school) is a public high school in Ho Chi Minh City, Vietnam. The school was established in 1913 and is one of the best known high schools in Vietnamese education. It is named after Nguyễn Thị Minh Khai. The present Principal is Ms Nguyễn Thị Hồng Chương.

History

In the early 20th century, traditional Confucian education in Viet Nam attached little importance to educating women. In 1908 some Vietnamese intellectuals proposed that the French colonial authority should construct a multi-level school for girls. The proposal was approved but owing to lack of funds, it wasn't until 1913 that the school began to be built on a large site in Legrand de la Liraye Street, Saigon (now is Điện Biên Phủ street, Ho Chi Minh City).

In 1915, the construction of the school was completed and the first pupils were admitted. The Governor-General of French Indochina at that time was Ernest Nestor Roume and he, together with Governor Courbeil, cut the inauguration tape and declared the beginning of a new school year. 42 schoolgirls were enrolled in the first year. Uniforms at that time were violet áo dài, symbolising the purity of Vietnamese women. For this reason the school had also been called Áo Tím (Violet Dress) all-girls school. All pupils lived in Sài Gòn and nearby areas and only later were hostels provided for schoolgirls from further afield. The school was organised on several levels: Infants (Enfantin), Superior (Supérieur), Conference of Primary Education (CEP). Students had to pass the exam for the Certificate of Fundamental Education after graduating from senior classes. In 1918, because of the increase in student numbers, a new building parallel to the previous one was constructed. The new building was multifunctional with the lower floor being used as a hostel for students. At the rear was the infirmary, the wash-room and the kitchen. That was also the place where domestic science and embroidery were taught.

In September 1922, governor-general Albert Sarraut started the first year of High-school First Grade classes. A marble stone that was carved "COLLÈGE DES JEUNES FILLES INDIGÈNES" (College of indigenous girls) was erected in front of the school gate, though the school continued to be known primarily as Áo Tím all-girls school. The first headmistress was a French principal named Lagrange. In order to enter the school, students had to pass essential education exams and school entrance exams. French had been taught since the beginning, being the official language used for teaching in High-school First Grade classes. Schoolgirls were only allowed to communicate in French with Vietnamese being taught in two Vietnamese literature hours per week.

Despite the fact that the school was administrated by the French, a movement against colonialism had been smouldering. In the 1920s, schoolgirls demonstrated at least twice. Once was in early 1920 when a French teacher asked Vietnamese students to give the top seats to French students and the other one was in 1924 at Phan Bội Châu's funeral ceremony.

In the summer of 1940, the Japanese army took over the building and later the British army occupied it. The school was moved to the premises of Đồ Chiểu primary school in the Tân Định area. Also in the 1940s, the school changed name becoming Collège Gia Long then Lycée Gia Long. Before the August Revolution in 1945, many schoolgirls directly participated in activities which were to encourage Việt Minh such as Quốc ngữ (National Language) propagation, the north starvation assistance and passive defense. Among the students, sacrifices were made and some took on great responsibilities in the new government after the August Revolution. In 1947, after being returned by the British, the school was found to be so damaged that the provisional principal had to ask for financial help in order to repair the buildings. In 1949 the school was once again expanded and a two-storey building was constructed in Bà Huyện Thanh Quan Street in order to meet the increasing student numbers. Also in 1949, Trương Vĩnh Ký school students organised a student strike to commemorate Nam Kỳ Khởi Nghĩa Date which led to the school being closed. In 1950, after a protracted struggle contributed to by students from other schools all over Sài Gòn-Gia Định (among whom many made sacrifices, such as Trần Văn Ơn of Trương Vĩnh Ký school), the school re-opened and marked a significant event: it was the first time a Vietnamese had been chosen as principal of the school, perceptress Nguyễn Thị Châu. In 1952, Vietnamese education replaced French education little by little and schoolgirls had to study in both English and French. The entrance exams were very hard and comparable with Lycée Petrus Ký school's entrance exams, with contestants coming from all over the south of Việt Nam including Sài Gòn, Chợ Lớn, Gia Định, Biên Hòa and Tân An. In a high school entrance exam in about 1971, there were 8000 participants who registered and took the test but only 819 of them passed. In 1953, the uniforms were changed from violet Áo dài to white Áo dài with an emblem of a yellow apricot blossom stitched to the dresses. At the same time, the French education was changed into Vietnamese and the school was renamed Gia Long All-girls High School.

Throughout the following years, the school continued to develop. In 1964 it ceased to be a boarding-school and the residential rooms were turned into classrooms and in 1965 a new library was constructed. There were about 55 classes from 4th grade to 1st grade studying in the morning, and 45 classes from 7th grade to 5th grade studying in the afternoon with a total of 3000 students. At that time, many schoolgirls participated fervently in anti-war movements. For this reason, researcher Trần Bạch Đằng called many schoolgirl generations "Violet dresses throughout the country roads".

After a ceremony on April 30, 1975, the school was officially renamed Nguyễn Thị Minh Khai Junior-Senior High School. In the 1978–1979 school year, the Junior High School was dissolved and the school started to enroll both boys and girls.

In 2003, the school was included in a list of 55 buildings in Sài Gòn to be preserved because of their historical and architectural interest.

Currently, there is a special village built since 2000, about 20 km away from Ho Chi Minh City called Gia Long (the old name of Nguyễn Thị Minh Khai HS). It is a retiral village for generations of former teachers and students of Áo Tím - Gia Long - Minh Khai to gather in their old age.

Principal List

Education and widening relations

Education
The school is organised by the managing board, comprising headmistress Dương Thị Trúc Bạch and assistant principals Nguyễn Thị Kim Hoa, Trần Văn Khánh. There are groups of teachers in charge of literature, history, geography, civics, foreign language, maths, physics, chemistry, biology, technology, IT and physical education. Besides this there are other functional offices, the Labour Union and the Youth Union. Students take the entrance exams based on the general regulations of the Ministry of Education and Training in Việt Nam. There are a total of 68 classrooms divided to 3 grades 10-11-12 along with functional rooms such as the library, laboratories, computer rooms, subject rooms, practice rooms, teaching tools rooms, the playground, the judo room and the aerobics room,  school owned swimming pool and basketball playground.
.

Innovations
Since the previous decade, Nguyễn Thị Minh Khai High School has been a pioneer in teaching methods with a whole series of innovations of which the significant is that optimal ways of teaching and the application of IT are used for designing lectures. Thanks to the development of IT at the school, in 2004, the school was invited by Intel corporation to attend new projects and ways of educating. Thereupon, VVOB and Microsoft corporation continued to propose that we attend other study projects in the next years.

These projects were welcomed by students and teachers. Success was acknowledged by the visit on February 27, 2006, of Mr. Craig Barrett, the ex-chairman of Intel Corporation, the deputy Minister of Education and Training, Nguyễn Tấn Phát, and other superior officials. In 2008, VVOB corporation invited the physics group to record a lesson in order to provide teaching material for the other countries participating in the projects.

Exchanges and cooperation
The school welcomes 2 delegations of French schools every school year, and sends 2 groups to France for study exchanges.
The school also links to famous universities in Thailand, Japan, Taiwan and Singapore. It also cooperates in education, allowing the National University of Singapore and Nanyang Technological University to hold teach-ins to introduce foreign study in Singapore.

Linked schools
Currently the school is twinned with about 20 French schools and 1 Australian school.

Culture
Literature
Composer Phạm Duy in the song Con đường tình ta đi mentioned his lovers who studied at Trưng Vương and Gia Long schools:

Hỡi người tình Gia Long,
Hỡi người trong cuộc sống
Con đường này xin dâng
Cho người bình thường

Violet dresses, or Gia Long's violet dresses inspired many artists to compose, like the poem Hoa Trắng Thôi Cài Trên Áo Tím by Hà Huy Hà:

Mười năm trước em còn đi học
Áo tím điểm tô đời nữ sinh
Hoa trắng cài duyên trên áo tím
Em là cô gái tuổi băng trinh.

Film
Possessing an impressive and antique appearance, Nguyễn Thị Minh Khai High School has been chosen as the location for several films and series, such as:
Mười: The Legend of a Portrait (released in 2007)
 Kính vạn hoa (TV series, season 3)

Music
 Ngồi lại bên nhau

References

Educational institutions established in 1915
High schools in Ho Chi Minh City
1915 establishments in Vietnam